Sorbon may refer to:

 Sorbon, Ardennes, France; a commune
 Jérémy Sorbon (born 1983) French soccer player
 Robert de Sorbon (1201-1274) founder of The Sorbonne

See also
 Sorbonne (disambiguation)

Disambig-Class AfC articles